There were two elections in Ireland on 24 May 1921, as a result of the Government of Ireland Act 1920 to establish the House of Commons of Northern Ireland and the House of Commons of Southern Ireland. A resolution of Dáil Éireann on 10 May 1921 held that these elections were to be regarded as elections to Dáil Éireann and that all those returned at these elections be regarded as members of Dáil Éireann. According to this theory of Irish republicanism, these elections provided the membership of the Second Dáil. The Second Dáil lasted  days.

In the election to the area designated as Northern Ireland, 52 members were elected from 9 geographic constituencies and Queen's University of Belfast. The Ulster Unionist Party won 40 seats, while Sinn Féin and the Nationalist Party (the successor to the Irish Parliamentary Party) won six seats each; 5 of those elected for Sinn Féin were also elected for constituencies in Southern Ireland, while Nationalist Party leader Joseph Devlin was elected to two seats in Northern Ireland. On 7 June Sir James Craig, leader of the UUP, became the first Prime Minister of Northern Ireland.

In the election to the area designated as Southern Ireland, 124 Sinn Féin candidates were returned unopposed from 26 geographic constituencies and the National University constituency. The Dublin University constituency returned four Independent Unionist candidates, also unopposed. The four Independent Unionists met as the House of Commons of Southern Ireland on 28 June 1921, for one meeting only.

Those elected for Sinn Féin sat as the Second Dáil, calling themselves Teachtaí Dála (TDs). There were 125 TDs, taking into account that five represented two constituencies. The others elected did not respond to the invitation. Although the contemporaneous roll of Dáil membership included all those elected in both Northern Ireland and Southern Ireland, the database of Oireachtas members includes only those elected for Sinn Féin. For clarity on the representation of constituencies, they are listed here in a single list.

It was during the 2nd Dáil that the Anglo-Irish Treaty was debated, and it was approved in a Dáil vote on 7 January 1922.

Election result

Members by constituency
Only those elected for Sinn Féin chose to sit as TDs in the Second Dáil.

Vacancies

See also
Dáil constituencies
Historic Dáil constituencies

Footnotes

References

 
2nd Dáil
02